
Radziejów County is a unit of territorial administration and local government (powiat) in Kuyavian-Pomeranian Voivodeship, north-central Poland. It came into being on January 1, 1999, as a result of the Polish local government reforms passed in 1998.

As of 2019 its total population is 40,546, out of which the population of Radziejów is 5,578, that of Piotrków Kujawski is 4,456, and the rural population is 30,512.

Neighbouring counties
Radziejów County is bordered by Aleksandrów County to the north, Włocławek County to the east, Koło County and Konin County to the south, and Inowrocław County to the north-west.

Administrative division
The county is subdivided into seven gminas (one urban, one urban-rural and five rural). These are listed in the following table, in descending order of population.

References
   Polish official population figures 2019

 
Land counties of Kuyavian-Pomeranian Voivodeship